Happy Birthday to Me is a 1981 slasher film directed by J. Lee Thompson and starring Melissa Sue Anderson and Glenn Ford. Its plot revolves around six brutal murders occurring around a popular college senior's birthday. Filmed primarily in Canada and upstate New York, Happy Birthday to Me was distributed by Columbia Pictures, and released theatrically in North America on May 15, 1981. The film received mostly mixed reviews from critics.

Plot
Virginia "Ginny" Wainwright is a pretty and popular high school senior at Crawford Academy, a member of the school's "Top Ten," an elite clique of the most privileged and popular students. Each night, the group meets at the Silent Woman Tavern, a local pub. One night en route to the tavern, Bernadette O'Hara is attacked in her car by an unseen assailant. She struggles and plays dead to catch the killer off-guard before running to get help. She then runs into an unseen individual whom she is familiar with and begs for help, but the person slashes her neck with a straight razor.

The Top Ten becomes concerned when Bernadette fails to arrive at the pub. Upon leaving, the group sees the nearby drawbridge raising and decide to play a game of chicken. Ginny is pushed into a car by Ann Thomason, and each of the group attempt to cross the bridge as it raises; the car Ginny is in barely clears the bridge, crashing as it meets the other side. Distraught, Ginny runs home, stopping at her mother's grave in an adjacent cemetery. At her home, Etienne, a Top Ten member, breaks into Ginny's room and steals her underwear.

Bernadette fails to show up at school the following day. Ginny, who is plagued by repressed memories, visits her on-call psychiatrist, Dr. Faraday, with whom she previously underwent an experimental brain tissue restoration procedure after surviving a harrowing accident at the drawbridge. As Ginny attempts to resume her normal life, her fellow Top Ten members are murdered in vicious and violent ways: Etienne is strangled when his scarf gets thrown into the spokes of his motorcycle, and Greg's neck is crushed in his room while lifting weights. Ann and Ginny go to Alfred's house as he has been acting odd lately and discovers he is an elaborate prosthetic make up artist with a creepy replica of Bernadette's head

One night, Alfred, a Top Ten member who is infatuated with Ginny, follows her to her mother's grave. In retaliation, she stabs him with a pair of garden shears. On the weekend of Ginny's 18th birthday, her father leaves for a business trip. After a school dance, Ginny invites Steve to her house and prepares shish kebabs. While the two are drinking wine and smoking marijuana, Ginny begins to feed Steve with the kebab, but violently shoves the skewer down his throat.

Ann arrives at Ginny's house the following morning and finds Ginny taking a shower. In the shower, Ginny has a flashback of her mother's death: Her mother, a newly-inducted socialite, invites the Top Ten to Ginny's birthday celebration four years earlier and is concerned when no guests have arrived. After questioned by her mother, Ginny tearfully mentions the group are attending a party Ann is having instead. Humiliated, her mother drives drunk to the Thomasons' house with Ginny, where she is denied entry by Mr. Thomason's gatekeeper. Enraged and upset, she attempts to drive across a raising drawbridge, causing their car to fall into the water. Pinned beneath the steering wheel, Ginny's mother drowns. Ginny, however, manages to swim to safety.

Paranoid that she may be murdering her friends during blackout episodes, Ginny visits Dr. Faraday. When she confronts him over the procedure she underwent, he is evasive, and she murders him with a fireplace poker. Mr. Wainright returns home during a thunderstorm for Ginny's birthday and finds a pool of blood in the foyer. He flees hysterically and finds one of Ginny's friends, Amelia, standing in the yard in what seems to be a state of shock, clutching a wrapped gift. In the cemetery, he discovers his late wife's grave to have been robbed, with Dr. Faraday's corpse lying in it.

Mr. Wainright notices a light on inside the family's guest cottage. Inside, he finds the bodies of each member of the Top Ten seated at a table alongside his dead wife's corpse. He then sees Ginny enter the room with a birthday cake, singing "Happy Birthday" to herself, seeming to have lost her mind. Feeling he has failed his daughter with her treatment, Ginny suddenly slashes her father's throat. He dies, failing to notice another girl is seated at the table with her head down. Ginny then goes toward the girl, who also appears to be Ginny. As the girl comes to the Ginny we have seen throughout the film, she begins to raise her voice saying she did it all for her, as she ruined her last party. Suddenly the two Ginnys struggle and the other girl is revealed as Ann, who has disguised herself as Ginny with an elaborate latex mask probably made by Alfred. Ann removes the mask, ranting and raving over her father's affair with Ginny's mother and how it destroyed her family. Ann reveals that she and Ginny are half-sisters and it's all her fault. Ginny manages to wrestle the knife from Ann and stabs her to death. As she stands over Ann's corpse holding the bloodied knife, a police officer enters the cottage and says, "What have you done?"

Cast
 Melissa Sue Anderson as Virginia "Ginny" Wainwright
 Glenn Ford as Dr. David Faraday
 Lawrence Dane as Harold "Hal" Wainwright
 Sharon Acker as Estelle Wainwright
 Frances Hyland as Mrs. Patterson
 Tracey E. Bregman as Ann Thomerson
 Jack Blum as Alfred Morris
 Matt Craven as Steve Maxwell
 Lenore Zann as Maggie
 David Eisner as Rudi
 Michel-René Labelle as Etienne Vercures
 Richard Rebiere as Greg Hellman
 Lesleh Donaldson as Bernadette O'Hara
 Lisa Langlois as Amelia
 Ron Lea as Amelia's Date

Production

Concept and pre-production
Happy Birthday to Me was produced by John Dunning and André Link, as a Cinépix production. Dunning and Link would team up again on another Canadian slasher, My Bloody Valentine (1981), which went into production within a week of Happy Birthday to Me wrapping; however, My Bloody Valentine was actually released first, rushed to meet a February 11, 1981 release date in time for Valentine's Day. Keen to get their classier, bigger-budgeted Happy Birthday to Me released, Dunning and Link quickly realized that gimmicks were being used up by other slasher movies in the wake of John Carpenter’s Halloween (1978) and Sean S. Cunningham’s Friday the 13th (1980). 1980 alone saw the release of Friday the 13th, as well as two New Year's Eve-themed horror movies, Terror Train (1980) and New Year’s Evil (1980), as well as Christmas-themed films To All a Goodnight (1980) and Christmas Evil (1980), the wedding-themed He Knows You’re Alone (1980), Prom Night (1980), and Mother’s Day (1980) (followed by Graduation Day and the Thanksgiving-based Home Sweet Home the following year). Because everyone has a birthday, Dunning and Link believed that Happy Birthday to Me could have universal appeal. They hired John Saxton, a University of Toronto English professor, to develop the story. The subplot involving Virginia's brain injury came from Dunning reading an article about  regenerating frogs with electricity; he figured this could form the basis for a murder mystery where a girl suffers flashbacks and blackouts yet is unsure of her role in the mayhem around her.

Although it seems to have been directly influenced by the success of Friday the 13th and Prom Night, pre-production on Happy Birthday to Me had started before those films had been released, which more than hints that the huge success of Halloween was perhaps more of an influence (although the Grand Guignol elements of Friday the 13th may also have contributed).

The specialized genre website 'Retro Slashers has a copy of the script purporting to be a third draft from April 1980, where the major difference is that Virginia is actually the killer, possessed by the spirit of her deceased mother. Although this ending logistically makes more sense than the ending that was filmed, the filmmakers thought that what was originally scripted was not climactic enough. Still, the majority of the film does point to this original ending, which indicates the switch came well into production. This version of the script also features a good number of scenes that were either never shot or rewritten, including some that show more clearly Alfred's love for Virginia and Virginia's difficult relationship with her father.

The script was completely reworked by screenwriting team Timothy Bond and Peter Jobin before production started.

Casting
Actress Melissa Sue Anderson, who had garnered childhood fame for her portrayal of Mary Ingalls on the television series Little House on the Prairie, was cast in the film's lead, marking her major feature debut. Lisa Langlois auditioned for the role of Ann, but the role went to Tracey Bregman instead.

Filming
Happy Birthday to Me began production in early July 1980. At the helm was the British director J. Lee Thompson, famous for the classic Cape Fear (1962). Thompson had also been a dialogue coach to Alfred Hitchcock years before. Thompson had actively been looking to direct a thriller, and became attached to Happy Birthday to Me. In the press pack he stated: "What attracted me to this script was that the young people stood out as vivid, individual characters. The difference between a good chiller and exploitative junk, at least in my opinion, is whether or not you care about the victims".

Jack Blum, who played Alfred in the film, said that Thompson took the film seriously. Thompson would later direct the Charles Bronson thriller 10 to Midnight (1983), which featured more exploitative material than Happy Birthday to Me. Hollywood actor Glenn Ford, who played Jonathan Kent in Richard Donner’s Superman (1978), was less-than-thrilled to be in a slasher film. Apparently Ford was unpleasant on the set.

The film's make-up effects were done by special effects guru Tom Burman (who replaced Stéphan Dupuis just three weeks before the cameras were due to start rolling). Dupuis later did the duties on another bigger budget Canadian slasher, Visiting Hours (1982), but left the production for undisclosed reasons. Ironically, in an issue of Fangoria from 1981, Burman criticizes the level of gore in films at that time.

Happy Birthday to Me finished filming in September 1980 (five months after the release of Friday the 13th). Much of it was shot in and around Loyola College in Montreal, while the drawbridge scenes were actually filmed in Phoenix, New York, just outside Syracuse. The producers found it difficult to find the right bridge closer to the main production, as the expansion of the Highway system had made them increasingly rare. The whole town of Phoenix came to watch the dangerous stunts, where a total of fifteen cars were junked, and one stunt driver was hospitalized with two broken ankles. The bridge itself has since been removed and replaced by a bridge further to the north.  Additional photography occurred on the campuses of Concordia University and McGill University.

Director Thompson became known for tossing buckets of blood about on the set of the film to increase the on-screen gore; according to producer John Dunning, with the assistance of special effects man Tom Burman, Thompson "would be splashing blood all over the place".

The film's ending was changed to hide the fact that the script was being rewritten so late in production.

Bo Harwood and Lance Rubin provided the film's score. Syreeta, one-time wife of Stevie Wonder, provided the eerie closing track, composed by Lance Rubin that plays over the credits.

Release

Promotion
Columbia Pictures bought the $2.5 million production for $3.5 million, following Paramount Pictures' lead with buying Friday the 13th the year before. Columbia reportedly put as much money into promoting the film as it cost to make. The promotional materials for the film boasted its numerous unusual death sequences as "six of the most bizarre murders you will ever see". The theatrical poster featured sub-taglines reading: "John will never eat shish kebab again" and "Steven will never ride a motorcycle again", despite the fact that there is no character named "John" in the film, while Steven is the character who dies by a shish kekab; Etienne is the character who suffers a death via a motorcycle.

Dunning and Link didn't like the advertising campaign that Columbia Pictures had planned; they thought it should have been more subtle and worried that it might put off as many people as it attracted. They were concerned that only a handful of the murders in the film were truly bizarre and that the audience might feel cheated.

Columbia Pictures really pushed the promotional manual for Happy Birthday to Me, which was jam-packed with ideas for cinemas to promote the film. Although it is not clear how many picture houses really embraced the film's promotion, some of the more colorful ideas were to stage a mini-recreation of the film's final scene (without the bodies), but with a butchered birthday cake with crimson candles surrounded by glittering birthday party hats, all to be set upon a fake coffin. People celebrating their own birthdays were encouraged to bring family and friends with incentives, such as T-shirts and party hats. They also suggested having a member of staff, dressed in funereal black, preventing anyone from entering the auditorium during the final ten minutes. Those in line would then be offered "a bite-sized slice of Virginia's birthday cake" from the concession stand.

The promotion manual also had many ideas for radio disc jockeys to promote the film, including a special 'scream in'. Callers would be asked questions such as, "How would you react if you went to a birthday party … and you were the only person at the dinner table who was still alive?" Those with the best set of lungs would win free passes to the film. The manual also encouraged the DJ's to attend dressed as funeral attendants and give each girl a white lily and each boy a blood-red carnation.

The film was also advertised with trailers both at the cinema and on TV. Most trailers culminate with a birthday cake being split with an axe, although an axe does not actually feature in the film itself.

Box office
Happy Birthday to Me opened in the United States and Canada on May 15, 1981 in 1,124 theatres and grossed $3,712,597 in its opening weekend. It grossed $10.6 million at the North American box office.

Critical response
Vincent Canby in The New York Times called it a confused ripoff of Friday the 13th and Prom Night (both released in 1980). James Harwood in Variety wrote that the film gets "dumber and dumber until the fitful finale". Linda Gross of the Los Angeles Times referred to the film as a "well-directed, suspenseful and nauseatingly violent horror movie" that is "gratuitously mean", commending it as technically well-made but criticizing it for its violent content. The Baltimore Evening Suns Lou Cedrone wrote "it is sad to know that a director of this stature has descended to this, a bloody horror film. The movie has been done with professionalism, but in the end, like The Fan, Happy Birthday to Me is so much bloodletting, all of it in vivid color". Siskel & Ebert chose it as one of their "Dogs of the Week" on an episode of their show in 1981.

Candice Russell of the Fort Lauderdale News praised the film as a "more than competently made chiller", adding that director Thompson "plays out the scenes where we anticipate mayhem like a virtuoso violinist".

Ron Cowan of Statesman Journal commended the acting of Anderson and direction of Thompson, and wrote that he "develops the characters of the young actors enough that they take on the semblance of real people". However, he goes on to call the plot derivative of other films in the genre. Bill Cosford of the Miami Herald gave it a scathing review, criticizing the plot for being "incomprehensible". Cosford wrote that its title and "attractive star" are the only things working for the film.

AllMovie gave the film a mixed review, writing, "Happy Birthday to Me stands out from the slasher movie pack of the early '80s because it pushes all the genre's elements to absurd heights. The murders, plot twists and, especially, the last-minute revelations that are dished up in the final reel don't just deny credibility, they outright defy it".

Home media
Sony Pictures Home Entertainment released Happy Birthday to Me on DVD in 2004 with an entirely different, uncredited musical score that diverged from the score used in the original cut. In October 2009, Anchor Bay Entertainment re-released the film on DVD with original musical score reintroduced.

In 2012, the film made its premiere on Blu-ray through Mill Creek Entertainment on a double-feature disc paired with the original When a Stranger Calls (1979); this release, like the 2009 DVD, features the original 1981 musical score. The United Kingdom-based home media company Indicator Films released a region-free two-disc Blu-ray and DVD combination package in December 2016, which featured promotional materials, a commentary track, and both the original and alternate musical score. Mill Creek re-released the film as a standalone Blu-ray featuring a retro VHS-inspired slipcover in October 2018.

References

Sources

External links
 
 
 
 

1981 films
1981 horror films
1981 independent films
1980s American films
1980s Canadian films
1980s English-language films
1980s high school films
1980s mystery films
1980s serial killer films
1980s slasher films
1980s teen horror films
 
American high school films
American independent films
American mystery horror films
American serial killer films
American slasher films
American teen horror films
Canadian independent films
Canadian high school films
Canadian mystery films
Canadian serial killer films
Canadian slasher films
Columbia Pictures films
English-language Canadian films
Films about birthdays
Films directed by J. Lee Thompson
Films produced by John Dunning
Films set in Massachusetts
Films shot in Montreal
Films shot in New York (state)
Sororicide in fiction
Video nasties